The Sindh United Party (SUP) is a Sindhi nationalist political party which aims to have rights of People of Sindh over their homeland Sindh, Pakistan. It was founded by former Deputy Speaker of Sindh Assembly Syed Jalal Mehmood Shah in 2006.

History

The SUP was formed on 9 December 2006 at a political workers convention at G.M Syed Edifice Jamshoro, in Sindh. Syed Jalal Mehmood Shah, former deputy speaker of the Sindh Assembly, laid the foundation of the party. Syed Zain Shah is the current president of the Sindh united party

On 3 November 2007, the dictator General Musharaf imposed emergency and suspended 1973 constitution of country. For the restoration of democracy, SUP launched series of protests across the country in a peaceful way for SUP has a firm belief in the power of Non Violence as it has been the strongest advocate of religious harmony and separation of religion from state on account of its very foundations as a party which is supported by the people of Indus Valley Civilization connection to Sufism.
In the year 2015 SUP decided to launch a  mass mobilisation and awareness campaign after Eidul Fitr against terrorism, religious extremism and corruption in Sindh

G.M Syed Centre
The G.M Syed Centre is the residence and office of Sindh United Party at Jamshoro, established by Syed Jalal Mehmood Shah grandson of Saaen G.M Syed. Many researchers are offered food and residence in the world notable library of G.M Syed established within this centre. It's the place of learning for many Sindhi nationalists, scholars, researchers and common person.

See also 
 Dodo Maheri

References 

Political parties in Pakistan
Political parties established in 2006
Politics of Sindh
Sindhi nationalism